Melrose-Mindoro School District is centered in the town of Farmington, La Crosse County, Wisconsin. It has 770 students attending 3 schools in grades PK and K-12. According to state standards, 45% of students in this district are considered proficient in math and/or reading. The district has an annual budget of $8,751,000, spending an average of $11,684 per student. The District Office is located at N181 State Rd 108, Melrose, Wisconsin  54642.

References

School districts in Wisconsin
Education in La Crosse County, Wisconsin